Morvari (also Romanized as Morvārī and Marvarī; also known as Mavarī, Mawari, Morvārīd, and Morvarīd) is a village in Dehdez Rural District, Dehdez District, Izeh County, Khuzestan Province, Iran. At the 2006 census, its population was 32, in 6 families.

References 

Populated places in Izeh County